The Upper Klamath National Wildlife Refuge is a wildlife refuge in southwestern Klamath County on the shores of Upper Klamath Lake in Oregon. It is accessible only by boat from Rocky Point Resort and Rocky Point boat launch, Malone springs, and a few neighboring ramps. The refuge is part of the Klamath Basin National Wildlife Refuge Complex and is administered along with the other refuges of the complex from common offices in Tulelake, California.

References

External links 
 
 

1928 establishments in Oregon
Landforms of Klamath County, Oregon
National Wildlife Refuges in Oregon
Protected areas of Klamath County, Oregon
Wetlands of Oregon
Protected areas established in 1928